Regional spatial strategies (RSS) provided regional level planning frameworks for the regions of England outside London. (In London, spatial planning is the responsibility of the mayor.) They were introduced in 2004.  Their revocation was announced by the new Conservative/Liberal Democrat government on 6 July 2010.

History
RSS emerged from the Planning and Compulsory Purchase Act 2004, which abolished structure plans and replaced regional planning guidance (RPG) with RSS, which then became the strategic level plan charged with informing local development frameworks (LDFs). These were required to be in 'general conformity' with an RSS, which is a statutory, legal document.

Planning Policy Statement 11: Regional Spatial Strategies commonly abbreviated as PPS 11, set out the procedural policy on the nature of RSSs and focuses on what should happen in preparing revisions to them and explains how this relates to the Act and associated regulations. The current version was introduced in September 2004.

Objectives of RSS 
Regional Spatial Strategies were expected to:
 establish a 'spatial' vision and strategy specific to the region - for example, identifying in general terms areas for development or regeneration for a period of about 20 years ahead
 contribute to the achievement of sustainable development
 establish regionally specific policies, which are expected to add to rather than replicate national ones
 address regional or sub-regional issues that may cross county, unitary authority or district boundaries
 outline housing figures for district and unitary authorities to take forward in their local development frameworks
 establish priorities for environmental protection and enhancement, and define the 'general extent' of areas of green belt
 produce a regional Transport Strategy as part of the wider spatial strategy
 outline key priorities for investment, particularly in infrastructure, and identify delivery mechanisms, in order to support development
 identify how the region's waste should be dealt with
 be consistent with and supportive of other regional frameworks and strategies.

They were each subject to a strategic environmental assessment.

Process
RSS were prepared by the relevant regional planning body (RPB), in the form of the Regional Assembly, and were then submitted to the Secretary of State. Once the RPB prepared a draft RSS, it published it for at least 12 weeks public consultation.

Following public consultation, an Examination in Public was held to debate and test the RPB's proposals. A Panel formed by the Planning Inspectorate - independent of the RPB and central Government - oversaw this process. Following the Examination in Public, the Panel prepared a report of findings and recommendations to the Government on how the draft RSS might be improved. The Government then issued Proposed Changes to the draft strategy, taking account of the Panel's recommendations and representations on any matters not considered at the Examination in Public.

The Secretary of State then made any final amendments in the light of the responses to the Proposed Changes consultation, and issued the final 'Regional Spatial Strategy'.

Local authorities then prepared Local Development Documents, which were to be consistent with the Regional Spatial Strategy, identifying specific locations for development and conservation, and establishing local policies for managing development.

Implementation
By the end of 2006 there were five revised RSS submitted to the Secretary of State. In other regions, Examinations in Public were held in 2006 and 2007. The Panel's reports on each of these were published, and in some cases proposed changes to the RSS were subject to public consultation.

The East of England's RSS was the first RSS proper to have been submitted but was marred by political wranglings over housing numbers and transport infrastructure.
In October 2008 the RSS for the Southwest Region attracted more than 40,000 objections during Public Consultation thus placing the programme for roll out into serious delay.
By June 2009 objections to the RSS for the South East England led to a judicial review on the basis of various aspects of incompatibility of the document with European law, particularly on issues of Sustainability and Natural amenities.
The West Midlands RSS Phase two Revision underwent Examination in Public in summer 2009, and the panel published its report, but complications over obtaining a further impact assessment for the proposed changes meant that it was not adopted before the 2010 United Kingdom general election, and it progressed no further.

Revocation
In May 2010 the new Government announced the abolition of the Regional Strategies. They were formally revoked, under s79(6) of the Local Democracy Economic Development and Construction Act 2009, on 6 July 2010.

Supporting guidance to local authorities upon the revocation of RSS stated: "In the longer term the legal basis for Regional Strategies will be abolished through the "Localism Bill" that we are introducing in the current Parliamentary session. New ways for local authorities to address strategic planning and infrastructure issues based on cooperation will be introduced."

In respect of housing figures, the guidance stated that: "Local planning authorities will be responsible for establishing the right level of local housing provision in their area, and identifying a long term supply of housing land without the burden of regional housing targets. Some authorities may decide to retain their existing housing targets that were set out in the revoked Regional Strategies. Others may decide to review their housing targets."

On 10 November 2010 Mr Justice Sales ruled in the case of Cala Homes (South) Ltd v Secretary of State for Communities and Local Government that The Secretary of State for Communities and Local Government was not entitled to use the discretionary power to revoke regional strategies contained in s 79(6) of the Local Democracy, Economic Development and Construction Act 2009 to effect the practical abrogation of the regional strategies as a complete tier of planning policy guidance.

Commons Select Committee Report
In March 2011, the all-party Commons Communities and Local Government Committee published its report on the implications of the abolition of the RSS system.  It stated that: "The intended abolition of regional spatial planning strategies leaves a vacuum at the heart of the English planning system which could have profound social, economic and environmental consequences set to last for many years." Committee chair Clive Betts said:"Regional Spatial Strategies bridged the gap between those planning issues determined by local policy or concern, and those subject to policy goals defined at a national level – such as those for housing or renewable energy.  We...are concerned about the hiatus created by their intended abolition.  This is giving rise to an inertia that is likely to hinder development - making it much harder to deliver necessary but controversial or emotive 'larger than local' facilities - such as waste disposal sites, mineral workings or sites for gypsies and travellers. It will also make it more difficult to ensure that our national need for new housing is met."

The committee expressed concern about the lack of robust and consistent evidence to support local development plans, and asked the Government to bring forward transitional arrangements to ensure a coherent, efficient planning system for the future.  It also warned that the abolition of RSSs will hamper the UK's economic recovery and delay new house building.

See also
Planning Policy Statements
Town and country planning in the United Kingdom
Planning and Compulsory Purchase Act 2004

References

External links
Government Policy and Guidance: PPS11 Regional Spatial Strategies
Government Office for the North West
The South West [of England] Regional Assembly
Regional Spatial Strategy. From 1 July 2006, responsibility for the administration of the Regional Planning Budget transferred to the Planning Inspectorate from The Department for Communities and Local Government. This also includes links to Examination in Public websites

Regional planning in England
Town and country planning in England

de:Regionalplanung